Honour in Pawn is a 1916 British silent film which starred Helen Haye in her first film role.

The four-reel crime drama was based on the 1911 novel of the same name by W. B. Maxwell to a script by Harold Weston, who was also the Director. The production company was Broadwest Film Company while the Producer was Walter West.

Synopsis
A crooked dealer adopts a young woman thief and forces her to steal the plate of a knight.

Cast
Nancy Raeborn - Manora Thew 
Sir Roger Singleton - Julian Royce  
Harvey Denman - George Bellamy  
Giovanni Leraca - Ivan Berlyn  
Mrs Fortescue - Helen Haye  
Uncredited - Hetta Bartlett  
Uncredited - Marjorie Compton

References

External links
Honour in Pawn - Internet Movie Database

1916 films
British silent short films
1916 short films
British black-and-white films